Zalesice may refer to the following places:
Zalesice, Łódź Voivodeship (central Poland)
Zalesice, Masovian Voivodeship (east-central Poland)
Zalesice, Silesian Voivodeship (south Poland)